Générosité d'Alexandre or Generosity of Alexander is a neoclassical style, oil-on-canvas painting by Jérôme-Martin Langlois. The painting was exhibited at the 1819 Paris Salon and won a first-prize medal. It is currently on display at the Musée des Augustins in Toulouse, France. In the painting, Alexander the Great gives his concubine, Campaspe, as a gift to the painter Apelles when he sees that the painter has fallen in love with her. The painting is a depiction of a well-known and perhaps apocryphal story of Alexander the Great's generosity.

Description
In the painting Apelles is sketching Alexander the Great's mistress Campaspe and has fallen in love with her. Alexander is so appreciative of the painter's skill that he gives him Campaspe. The painter is portrayed as thankful and Campaspe is seen sitting with her feet on a leopard skin, looking down toward the floor.

The dimensions of the painting are  x . The Neoclassical style painting follows the theme of an unfinished 1813 painting with the same subject matter by Langlois' teacher Jacques-Louis David.

History
The painting won a first-prize medal and was purchased at the 1819 Paris Salon. It is in the Musée des Augustins in Toulouse, France, which is currently closed for renovations until 2025.  

Langlois also completed a black chalk presentation drawing, sized  x , in preparation for the painting. It was titled Alexander Ceding Campaspe to Apelles and was exhibited at Zagrelli, Brady & Co. in 1986.

References

External links

1819 paintings
Cultural depictions of Alexander the Great
Neoclassical paintings
Oil on canvas paintings
Paintings by Jérôme-Martin Langlois